Kate Nicole Wilson-Smith (born 9 January 1979) is a female badminton player from Australia.

Wilson-Smith competed in badminton at the 2004 Summer Olympics in women's doubles with partner Jane Crabtree.  They were defeated by Pernille Harder and Mette Schjoldager of Denmark in the round of 32. In mixed doubles, Wilson-Smith and partner Travis Denney lost to Björn Siegemund and Nicol Pitro of Germany in the round of 32.

At the 2010 Commonwealth Games, she won a bronze medal in the women's doubles, competing with countrywoman Tang He Tian.

References

External links 
 
 

Australian female badminton players
Badminton players at the 2004 Summer Olympics
Olympic badminton players of Australia
1979 births
Living people
Badminton players at the 2010 Commonwealth Games
Commonwealth Games medallists in badminton
Commonwealth Games bronze medallists for Australia
Badminton players at the 2006 Commonwealth Games
Medallists at the 2010 Commonwealth Games